Isis River is a locality in the Bundaberg Region, Queensland, Australia.

Geography 
The Isis River (from which the locality presumably takes its name) flows through the locality entering from the south-east (South Isis) and exiting to the north-east (Buxton/Cherwell).

The Bruce Highway passes through the locality from the west (South Isis/Horton) to the east (Cherwell).

In the south of the locality is the Wongi State Forest which extends into neighbouring Kullogum and Duckinwalla.

There is a small amount of cropping, most of the land is undeveloped native vegetation.

Education 
There are no schools in Isis River. The nearest primary and secondary schools are in Childers.

References 

Bundaberg Region
Localities in Queensland